Club Deportivo Marte was a Mexican football club.

History
The club began in Mexico City, but in the 1950s they moved to Cuernavaca, Morelos, Mexico. The early club mainly consisted of Mexican soldiers, hence the name, in homage of the Roman god of war.

Amateur era
The first tournament played by the club was during the 1928–29 season. In the early era, the club won two of its three titles.

First title
The first title came in the 1928–29 season, its first year. The club finished with 14 points from 8 matches, with a total of 7 victories and only 1 loss (at the time there were 2 points for a victory). The club made up a part of the Mexico national team in the 1930 FIFA World Cup in Uruguay.

Honours
Amateur Era: 2
1928-29, 1942–43

Primera División: 1
1953-54

Segunda División Profesional: 1
Verano 2000

Amateur Era: 1
1943 (Marte vs. Moctezuma)

Campeón de Campeones: 1
1954 (Marte vs. América)

Goalscorer title
Manuel Alonso (1942–43), (16 goals)
Marco A. de Almeida (1994–95), (15 goals)

See also
Football in Mexico

References

Defunct football clubs in Morelos
Association football clubs established in 1928
1928 establishments in Mexico
Ascenso MX teams
Primera Fuerza teams